Revelation 14 is the fourteenth chapter of the Book of Revelation or the Apocalypse of John in the New Testament of the Christian Bible. The book is traditionally attributed to John the Apostle, but the precise identity of the author remains a point of academic debate. This chapter contains the accounts of the lamb with 144,000 followers, the three angelic messages and the voice from heaven, as well as the harvest of the earth and the vintage of the earth. The Three Angels' messages in verses 6 to 12 form a central feature of the teaching and mission of the Seventh-day Adventist Church: "“Make disciples of Jesus Christ who live as His loving witnesses and proclaim to all people the everlasting gospel of the Three Angels’ Messages in preparation for His soon return".

Text
The original text was written in Koine Greek. This chapter is divided into 20 verses.

Textual witnesses
Some early manuscripts containing this chapter are among others:
Papyrus 115 (ca. AD 275; extant verses 1-3, 5-7, 10-11, 14-15, 18-20)
Papyrus 47 (3rd century; complete)
Codex Sinaiticus (330-360)
Codex Alexandrinus (400-440)
Codex Ephraemi Rescriptus (ca. 450; complete)

The Lamb and the 144,000 (14:1–5)
This part describes the army of the Lamb, ready for holy battle against the beast, consisting of adult males which 'keep themselves free of the ritual defilement incurred by sex'.

Verse 1
Then I looked, and behold, a Lamb standing on Mount Zion, and with Him one hundred and forty-four thousand, having His Father’s name written on their foreheads.
Translated as "a lamb" in the King James and New King James versions, but as "the lamb" in many other translations. This lamb is, "of course, the same as the lamb seen in chapter 5", but there the lamb looked "as if it had been slain", whereas here it is standing triumphant on Mount Zion: "probably the earthly one, [because] the heavenly Jerusalem of chapter 21 has not yet appeared".

The King James Version states that the 144,000 had "his Father's name" written on their foreheads but the majority of English translations refer to "his name and his Father’s name". This reading is supported by Codex Sinaiticus, Codex Alexandrinus and Codex Epraemi Rescriptus as well as most cursives and the writings of the early Fathers of the Church.

Verse 2
I heard a voice from heaven, like the voice of many waters, and like the voice of loud thunder. And I heard the sound of harpists playing their harps.
Johann Bengel emphasises that the same voice was heard, "first as of many waters and of great thundering, and next as of harpers".

Verse 3
They sang as it were a new song before the throne, before the four living creatures, and the elders; and no one could learn that song except the hundred and forty-four thousand who were redeemed from the earth.

Three Angelic Messages and a Voice from Heaven (14:6–13)
The angels in this section 'symbolize the effect on the nations of the confrontation of the forces of the beast and the Lamb', and in contrast to the eagle in Revelation 8:13, 'their messages are positive'.

Verse 6
Then I saw another angel flying in the midst of heaven, having the everlasting gospel to preach to those who dwell on the earth—to every nation, tribe, tongue, and people— 
"Another angel": the angel who is called "another" is different from "the voice" heard in Revelation 14:2, although this angel is the first in appearance with respect to the following angels (Revelation 14:8,).

Verse 7

Saying with a loud voice, Fear God, and give glory to him; for the hour of his judgment is come: and worship him that made heaven, and earth, and the sea, and the fountains of waters.

Verse 8
 And another angel followed, saying, 
 “Babylon is fallen, is fallen, that great city, because she has made all nations drink of the wine of the wrath of her fornication.”''
Cross reference: Isaiah 21:9, Revelation 18:2

The Harvest of the Earth and the Vintage of the Earth (14:14–20)
Two images at the end of this chapter are two different forms (cf. ) of 'the traditional eschatological image of harvest': the "grain harvest" (verses 14–16) and the "vintage" (verses 17–20), to follow the messages that the angels have given for the nations of the opportunity to respond to the witness of the martyrs in repentance (14:7) or to face the judgement of God (verses 9–11).

See also
 144000 (number)
 Book of Daniel
 Jesus Christ
 John's vision of the Son of Man
 Names and titles of Jesus in the New Testament
 Three Angels' Messages
 Related Bible parts: Revelation 4, Revelation 6, Revelation 7, Revelation 11

Notes

References

Sources

External links
 King James Bible - Wikisource
English Translation with Parallel Latin Vulgate 
Online Bible at GospelHall.org (ESV, KJV, Darby, American Standard Version, Bible in Basic English)
Multiple bible versions at Bible Gateway (NKJV, NIV, NRSV etc.)

14